"Los Ruiles National Reserve" is a small nature reserve located in easternmost Municipality of Pelluhue, Province of Cauquenes, Maule Region, Chile.

It lies in the foothills of the "Cordillera de la Costa", the Chilean Coast Range, and has a surface of 29 hectares.

Description

Los Ruiles National Reserve is a small oasis, next to the road that connects Chanco and Cauquenes. It protects native species of trees and lower plants that are unique in the Chilean Matorral. Some species are in danger of extinction, such as Nothofagus alessandri.

There is a reception area, several picnic tables and two footpaths.

External links

Conaf.cl: Los Ruiles Nature Reserve

National reserves of Chile
Protected areas of Maule Region
Chilean Matorral